Mazel Ampareen Lyngdoh (born May 5, 1965) is an Indian politician who has served as a Member of the Legislative Assembly from the Indian state of Meghalaya since 2008.  She currently serves as a Cabinet Minister in the State Government of Meghalaya. 

She was previously a Cabinet Minister in the Government of Meghalaya for Labour Affairs, Information Technology, Information & Broadcasting, Housing, Urban Development Affairs, and Housing from 2013 to 2018; and Minister for Education from 2009 to 2013.

Until August 2021, she served as a Secretary of the All India Congress Committee, in charge of the state of Mizoram. She served as the working president of the Indian National Congress in the state of Meghalaya until 2022.

She was the sole female member of the house in the 60 member Meghalaya Legislative Assembly from 2008 to 2013. Prior to joining active politics, she was a lecturer at St. Anthony's College, Shillong, where she taught mass communication.

Early life and family 

Ampareen Lyngdoh was born in Shillong. She is the daughter of Peter G. Marbaniang and Q. E Lyngdoh. Her father was a Member of Parliament and Speaker of the Meghalaya Legislative Assembly. Her brother, Robert Garnett Lyngdoh was a member of the Meghalaya Legislative Assembly who also served as the Home Minister in the Government of Meghalaya.

She is married and has three children.

Education 

Lyngdoh completed her school education at the Loreto Convent, Shillong.

She pursued her undergraduate degree in English at the Jesus and Mary College at the University of Delhi. She graduated from Jamia Milia Islamia University in 1990 with a master's degree in Mass Communication.

In 2013, Lyngdoh earned a Ph.D. from the North Eastern Hill University. The title of her thesis was Influence of Media on Public Opinion During The Periods of Social Unrest: A Study of Meghalaya.

Early career 

Lyngdoh was a professor of Mass Communications at St. Anthony's College, Shillong where she was the head of the Department of Mass Communication.

Political career 
She started her political career as a member of the Indian Youth Congress, and was closely involved in the election campaigns of her father, Peter G. Marbaniang and her brother Robert G. Lyngdoh before joining active politics. They were both leaders of the Indian National Congress.

United Democratic Party 
Lyngdoh briefly joined the United Democratic Party (UDP) in 2008 after the Indian National Congress refused to give her a ticket to contest the 2008 state Assembly elections.

When the United Democratic Party gave her an election ticket, 44 members of the party resigned in protest because her brother Robert G Lyngdoh was a Congress legislator and the state's minister for education at that time.

As a candidate from the United Democratic Party, Lyngdoh won the 2008 state assembly elections from the Laitumkhrah constituency, a stronghold of her family from which her father and her brother had been elected earlier to become the only woman MLA in the 8th Meghalaya Legislative Assembly.  She defeated Malcom B Tariang, who fought the election as an independent candidate.

Rejoining the Indian National Congress 
Lyngdoh met Indian National Congress President Sonia Gandhi in New Delhi, after which she resigned from the United Democratic Party and the Meghalaya Legislative Assembly on 31 March 2009.

She re-joined the Congress, her party rewarding her by making her the state's minister for education, although she was no longer a legislator. Her resignation from the Assembly resulted in a by-election, which she won in August 2009. Once again, she defeated Tariang, who fought as a UDP candidate this time.

She was the only female legislator in the Meghalaya Assembly from 2008 to 2013. During these five years, her assets increased by 9000%, from  23,518 to  2,100,000, according to the affidavits she submitted to the Election Commission.

On 14 February 2022, Lyngdoh along with 4 other fellow Congress MLAs was suspended by the party for backing the BJP allied NPP state government.

Positions in the Indian National Congress 

Indian National Congress President Rahul Gandhi appointed Lyngdoh a secretary of the All India Congress Committee in charge of Mizoram ahead of the crucial state assembly election in 2018. She was appointed President of the Meghalaya chapter of the All India Professionals Congress in August, 2018.

In August 2021, she was appointed a working president of the Indian National Congress in Meghalaya.

In February 2022, a group of 5 Indian National Congress MLAs led by Ampareen Lyngdoh gave their support to the Conrad Sangma National People's Party Bharatiya Janata Party backed government. This resulted in an expulsion of all five last remaining Indian National Congress MLAs.

Positions in government 
Lyngdoh has served as a Cabinet Minister in the state government, and during her first two terms as a Cabinet Minister, she held portfolios including Public Works Department, Information Technology, Information & Communication, Urban Development, Housing, Labour, Education and Tourism. She was the Chairman of the Meghalaya Urban Development Agency while holding the Urban Development portfolio.

Following her re-election as a member of the Meghalaya Legislative Assembly in 2023, Lyngdoh was appointed as a Cabinet Minister in the Meghalaya Democratic Alliance 2.0 Government.

Assembly committees 

Lyngdoh is the Chairperson  of the Meghalaya Assembly Standing Committee for the Empowerment of Women and a member of the Assembly Committee for Welfare of Scheduled Tribes, Scheduled Castes, and Other Backward Classes.

Legal issues 

In 2017, the High Court of Meghalaya cancelled the appointment of 365 teachers who were appointed in Government lower primary schools after allegations of irregularities in the selection process which were conducted in 2010 when Lyngdoh was the state's minister for education purportedly involved many politicians from the state. The court also directed the Central Bureau of Investigation to probe the "criminal aspect" of the irregularities that were alleged to have marked the selection process.

Electoral record 
In 2008 Lyngdoh contested the Laitumkhrah constituency as a UDP candidate, winning her first election to the state assembly.

In 2009 she contested the by-election in the Laitumkhrah constituency as an Indian National Congress candidate, winning again.

In 2013 she contested the East Shillong Constituency, defeating the UDP candidate and former Deputy Chief Minister Bindo M Lanong.

In 2018 Lyngdoh contested the East Shillong Constituency, once again winning the seat with a 36% margin. Her nearest rival from the Bharatiya Janata Party by over 6,000 votes. She also defeated former Deputy Chief Minister Bindo M Lanong of the UDP.

References 

Indian National Congress politicians
People from Shillong
Living people
State cabinet ministers of Meghalaya
United Democratic Party (Meghalaya) politicians
Meghalaya MLAs 2013–2018
Meghalaya MLAs 2018–2023
Jamia Millia Islamia alumni
Delhi University alumni
1965 births
Meghalaya MLAs 2008–2013
National People's Party (India) politicians